Saúde is a district in the city of São Paulo, Brazil.

See also
Subdivisions of São Paulo

External links

Districts of São Paulo